Heinar is a masculine given name.

People named Heinar include:
 Heinar Kipphardt (1922–1982), German writer

Given names